Tylomelania toradjarum is a species of freshwater snail with an operculum, an aquatic gastropod mollusk in the family Pachychilidae.

The specific name toradjarum is in honor of Toraja (spelling variant Toradja), an ethnic group indigenous to Sulawesi.

Distribution 
This species is endemic to Lake Poso, Sulawesi, Indonesia. The type locality is the Lake Poso.

Description 

The shell has 7-9 whorls.

The width of the shell is 16 mm. The height of the shell is 54 mm. The width of the aperture is 10 mm. The height of the aperture is 15 mm.

There are 9 concentric lines on the operculum.

References

External links 
 von Rintelen T. & Glaubrecht M. (2005). "Anatomy of an adaptive radiation: a unique reproductive strategy in the endemic freshwater gastropod Tylomelania (Cerithioidea: Pachychilidae) on Sulawesi, Indonesia and its biogeographical implications." Biological Journal of the Linnean Society 85: 513–542. .

toradjarum
Gastropods described in 1897